Aleksandr Troshchilo (born January 16, 1960) is a retired track and field sprinter from the Soviet Union, known for winning the bronze medal in the men's 4x400 metres relay at the 1982 European Championships. A year later he triumphed in the same event at the inaugural 1983 World Championships alongside Sergey Lovachov, Nikolay Chernetskiy, and Viktor Markin, clocking a total time of 3:00.79.

References

 

1960 births
Living people
Belarusian male sprinters
Soviet male sprinters
Athletes (track and field) at the 1980 Summer Olympics
Olympic athletes of the Soviet Union
Athletes from Minsk
World Athletics Championships athletes for the Soviet Union
World Athletics Championships medalists
European Athletics Championships medalists
Universiade medalists in athletics (track and field)
Universiade silver medalists for the Soviet Union
World Athletics Championships winners
Friendship Games medalists in athletics